Liushan is a town in Linqu County, Weifang, in Shandong province, China. , it has 21 villages under its administration. 
Liushanzhai Village
Xinzhuang Village
Houtuan Village
Houjiazhuang Village
Fanjiahe Village
Mazhuang Village
Houjiahe Village
Guojiazhuang Village
Yingshanhe Village
Sunzhuang Village
Zhujiagou Village
Hongshan Village
Yanghe Village
Xinshan Village
Cuifei Village
Dujiazhuang Village
Miaoshan Village
Chengtou Village
Xujiahe Village
Weijia Village
Fengjiagou Village

References

Township-level divisions of Shandong
Linqu County